Matruh may refer to:

 Matruh al-Arabi, governor of Barcelona from 778 to 792
The Matrouh Governorate in Egypt
Matruh, Yemen
The Mediterranean harbor and naval port of Mersa Matruh in the Matrouh Governorate